The Vistulan dialect was a dialect of Low Prussian, which belongs to Low German. The dialect was spoken in West Prussia, today in Poland. It had a border to Mundart der Weichselwerder. It was spoken around 
Jezioro Żarnowieckie (Zarnowitzer See), Gdańsk (Danzig) and Grudziądz (Graudenz).

Geography 
It was geographically close to a transitional area of East Pomeranian dialect and Low Prussian, which is part of East Pomeranian. The transitional area would end at about Chojnice (Konitz). Other places within this area included Bytów (Bütow), Lębork (Lauenburg), Bydgoszcz (Bromberg) and  Toruń (Thorn). Within Low German in West Prussia, there was a major bundle of isoglosses in roughly the line Brodnica-Gardeja-Nowe and continuing somewhere between Kościerzyna and Chojnice.

Phonology 
In Gdańsk, it had High German a as ǫ before l in words such as ǫl for High German alt and hǫle for High German halten. Another typical example is mǫn for High German Mann. The dialect of Gdańsk also has mǭke for High German machen High German, nǭˠel for High German Nagel, šlǭˠen for High German schlagen inter alia.
	
It had a and ä in cases such as nat and nät for High German Netz.  
 It had ek ben I am for ek sī.

History 
Already in the age of the Teutonic Order there were Dutch colonists in 
Danzig. By 1586 there were Mennonite congregations in both Graudenz and Danzig.  
Within the coastal area from Gdańsk to Elbląg, the denomination Flemish Mennonites once predominated among the Mennonites, whereas in Vistula valley the denomination Frisian Mennonites did.
Some of the Flemish colonists of Chortitza Colony were from the 
Danzig area. Low German with Dutch remnants was often still spoken in Danzig by Mennonite families at home in the first half of the 19th century.  
In 1780 a German hymnbook was introduced, partly translated from Dutch. Until then, the Danzig congregation had used Dutch songbooks.
Until the second half of the 18th century, Mennonite sermons were in Dutch. Numerous words in the Danzig area were from Dutch, in particular nautical and commercial vocabulary.
Towards the end of the 18th century, the language spoken at home in long-established merchant families in Danzig was still Low German, this changed.   
Use in Danzig has since then been restricted to workers and small artisans. 
It was barely understood in privileged circles, but best by those who had 
the opportunity to hear it with their subordinates every day. In the countryside, Low German was still spoken by the landowners, if they preserved the rural way of life. 
In the second half of the 19th century, Low German had a considerable decline. 
Dialekt des Weichselgebietes is among the varieties on which Plautdietsch is based and has the greatest phonetic similarity to. There were Frisian Mennonites in Rudniki, Kwidzyn County 
(Rudnerweide), Sporowo (Sparrau), Pastwa (Pastwa), 
Kowalewo Pomorskie (Schönsee), Barcice, Pomeranian Voivodeship (Tragheimerweide) and Mała Nieszawka (Obernessau).
In Gdańsk and Stogi, in originally open syllables before k and x, a became o:. 
There were congregations of Frisian Mennonites in Gdańsk, Mątawy, Kowalewo Pomorskie and  
Barcice, Lesser Poland Voivodeship. There were congregations of Flemish Mennonites in Gdańsk, Dziewięć Włók and Przechówko.
The switch from Dutch to High German as language of worship was earlier among Frisian Mennonites,  which probably was due to High German refugees in the same area. In urban congregations, the change of language of worship  from Dutch to High German was later, which possibly was caused by contact to Dutch congregations.

Hüttenpommersch 
The area of Hüttenpommersch is not always included in its entirety within Low Prussian. 
It was spoken of both sides of the border of Free City of Danzig.
It was spoken around Przywidz (Mariensee).
it had a transitional area to Low Prussian.
Within its area, Kashubian was spoken.

Palatal k becomes an affricate tx. 

G of High German is realized as j.

See also 
 Danzig German

References 

Low Prussian dialect
German dialects
Languages of Poland
Languages of Ukraine